Bektas Abubakirov (born December 12, 1972) is a retired boxer from Kazakhstan, who competed for his native country in the Men's Bantamweight (– 54 kg) at the 1996 Summer Olympics in Atlanta, Georgia. There he was defeated in the first round by France's Rachid Bouaita.

References
sports-reference

External links
 

1972 births
2009 deaths
Boxers at the 1996 Summer Olympics
Bantamweight boxers
Olympic boxers of Kazakhstan
Boxers at the 1994 Asian Games
Kazakhstani male boxers
Asian Games competitors for Kazakhstan
20th-century Kazakhstani people